Lilac, Syringa, a genus of 12 currently recognized species of flowering woody plants in the olive family.

Lilac, Lilacs or The Lilacs may also refer to:

Botanical
 California lilac, several species of the genus Ceanothus
 Syringa vulgaris, the common lilac
 Indian lilac or Persian lilac, Melia azedarach
 Native lilac or lilac vine, Hardenbergia violacea
 New Zealand lilac, Veronica hulkeana
 Buddleja davidii, summer lilac
 Hesperis matronalis, summer lilac

Transport
 Lilac (train), a train service in Japan
 Line 5 (São Paulo Metro), a rapid transit line in Brazil
 USS Lilac (1863), a ship used by the Union Navy in the American Civil War
 USCGC Lilac (WAGL-227), a former US Coast Guard lighthouse tender built 1933
 Lilac, a line of motorcycles produced by Marusho

Arts and entertainment
 Lilacs (painting), a painting by Vincent Van Gogh
 Lilacs (Walker), a musical composition for soprano and orchestra by George Walker
 The Lilacs (band), an American 1990s band
 Lilac (The Early November album), 2019
 Lilac (IU album), 2021
 "Lilac" (song), the title track of the album
 Sash Lilac, the protagonist of the video game Freedom Planet

Songs
 "Lilac" (song), by IU 
 Lilac, by Nanaka Suwa from Color me PURPLE (2020)

Other uses
 Lilac (color), a light purple color typical of most lilac flowers
 The Lilacs (Philadelphia), an 18th-century farmhouse in the United States
 Literatura Latino-Americana e do Caribe em Ciências da Saúde (LILACS), an online medicine and health sciences database
 LILAC, or Librarians' Information Literacy Conference, UK annual conference

See also